Robert Schaffner (24 July 1905 – 2 August 1979) was a Luxembourgian politician.

A founding member of the Patriotic and Democratic Group (GPD), now the Democratic Party, Schaffner entered politics after the German occupation during the Second World War. In 1945, he was elected to the Chamber of Deputies, in which he would remain (including spells as a government minister) until his death over three decades later.

He entered Pierre Dupong's government in 1947 as Minister for Public Works and Minister for Transport, replacing the Luxembourg Socialist Workers' Party's Victor Bodson. He remained in these positions for four years, before the ejection of the GPD from government in favour of the Luxembourg Socialist Workers' Party saw the roles reverse and Bodson return to the cabinet in Schaffner's place.

Schaffner was twice mayor of Echternach, from 1945 to 1947, and from 1970 to 1979.

T. Glad Bincham and A.W. Hurll, then General Secretary of The Boy Scouts Association, paid a visit to Belgium, the Netherlands, Luxembourg and France in October 1945. They were able to make valuable first-hand contacts with the leaders of the Scout movements in these countries, and to learn more of how Scouting had played a part during the occupation, and how it proposed to meet the future. In Luxembourg, they were received by Schaffner, the Scout Commissioner, who had been elected mayor of the ruined town of Echternach the day before, and was already drawing up plans for its reconstruction.

See also

References

 Scouting Round the World, John S. Wilson, first edition, Blandford Press 1959 p. 126 131

|-

Ministers for Public Works of Luxembourg
Ministers for Transport of Luxembourg
Mayors of places in Luxembourg
Members of the Chamber of Deputies (Luxembourg)
Councillors in Echternach
Democratic Party (Luxembourg) politicians
1905 births
1979 deaths
Scouting and Guiding in Luxembourg